Edward Wayne Spiezio (born October 31, 1941) is an American former professional baseball third baseman. He played in Major League Baseball (MLB) from 1964 to 1972 for the St. Louis Cardinals, San Diego Padres and Chicago White Sox.

Career
Spiezio spent five years with the Cardinals, being a member of the 1964 World Series and 1967 World Series championship teams, although he only played in the latter series. He also played in the 1968 World Series, which the Cardinals lost.

Notably, he also collected the first hit, first home run, and scored the first run in San Diego Padres history.  This took place at Opening Game on April 8, 1969, in the bottom of the fifth inning against Houston Astros right-hander Don Wilson.

In a nine-season career, Spiezio hit .238 (367-for-1544) with 39 home runs and 174 runs batted in, including 126 runs, 56 doubles, four triples, and 16 stolen bases in 554 games played.

Spiezio also played for four different minor-league teams in parts of five seasons spanning 1963–1972, posting a .263 average with 47 homers and 191 RBI in 383 games.

He also played for the Leones del Caracas and Tiburones de La Guaira clubs of the Venezuelan Winter League.

Personal life
Ed Spiezio is the father of Scott Spiezio, who played in MLB from 1996 to 2007 and completed his major-league career with the Cardinals. They are regarded as the third father-son tandem in Cardinals' history.

See also
 List of second-generation Major League Baseball players

References

Further reading
 SABR BioProject
 Brody, Tom C. "Please, Please, Ed Spiezio, Won't You Please Pop Up?" Sports Illustrated, April 12, 1965.

External links

1941 births
Baseball players from Illinois
Brunswick Cardinals players
Chicago White Sox players
Hawaii Islanders players
Jacksonville Suns players
Leones del Caracas players
American expatriate baseball players in Venezuela
Lewis Flyers baseball players
Living people
Major League Baseball third basemen
Sportspeople from Joliet, Illinois
St. Louis Cardinals players
San Diego Padres players
Tiburones de La Guaira players
Tulsa Oilers (baseball) players
Illinois Fighting Illini baseball players